Halfcut Records was launched in 2012 as an in-house label for Shock Records priority heavy music signings. With a long history of being the home to many popular punk, hardcore and heavy music acts in Australia including Bring Me the Horizon, Millencolin, Alexisonfire, The Bronx, The Offspring, Cancer Bats, The Devil Wears Prada, Fall Out Boy and All That Remains are among dozens of others that have been given a start down under thanks to Shock Records' team.

Shock Records' GM of Music, Leigh Gruppetta had this to say. "Shock Records has meant many things over the years to people due to the company enjoying great success over a broad range of genres. The punk and heavy music genres are certainly an area we have excelled of late so we believe the time is right to give these bands their own home. Halfcut is the brainchild of Stu Harvey and under his watchful eye the Shock Records team will be pulling out all stops to continue this success. Stu is the best in his field, bar none, so we couldn’t be more excited about the long term future of Halfcut for the business."

, the label's roster currently includes While She Sleeps, Gallows, Crossfaith, A Sight for Sewn Eyes, Auras, Belle Haven, Caulfield, Crystal Lake, Ritual and Thy Art Is Murder.

Halfcut releases

References

External links
 

Australian independent record labels
Heavy metal record labels
Record labels based in Melbourne
Alternative rock record labels
Hardcore record labels